The spiny blaasop (Tylerius spinosissimus) is a species of pufferfish. Originally native to the Indian Ocean, the southwestern Pacific Ocean and the Atlantic Ocean along the coast of South Africa, it has recently colonised the Levantine waters of the Mediterranean Sea, most likely as a Lessepsian migrant  from the Red Sea or in ballast water.  This species grows to a length of 5-15 cm (max. 20 cm).  It is the only species in its genus.

References

Tetraodontidae
Monotypic fish genera
Fish described in 1908